Jared Brush may refer to:
 Jared M. Brush (1814–1895), mayor of Pittsburgh
 Jared L. Brush (1835–1913), lieutenant governor of Colorado